The Harry F. Legg House is a house in the Elliot Park neighborhood of Minneapolis, Minnesota, United States.  The house appears to have been built by a tract housing developer, and its style reflects that of houses for middle to upper-class professional families in the late 18th century.  The house retains its Queen Anne architectural integrity, having been altered little since it was originally built.  The interior woodwork may have come from "made to order" catalogs that were circulating around that time.  The house is listed on the National Register of Historic Places.

References

1887 establishments in Minnesota
Houses completed in 1887
Houses in Minneapolis
Houses on the National Register of Historic Places in Minnesota
National Register of Historic Places in Minneapolis
Queen Anne architecture in Minnesota